Tur (also Romanized as Ţūr and Toor) is a village in Saruq Rural District, Saruq District, Farahan County, Markazi Province, Iran. At the 2006 census, its population was 845, in 212 families.

References 

Populated places in Farahan County